Miguel Montes may refer to:
Miguel Montes (footballer, born 1940), Spanish football forward and manager
Miguel Montes (handballer) (born 1972), Cuban handballer
Miguel Montes (footballer, born 1980), Salvadoran football goalkeeper
Miguel Montes de Oca (born 1982), Argentine football forward